Tukuran Technical-Vocational High School  is  a public high school located in Tukuran, Zamboanga del Sur, Philippines. It is composed of five campuses and the leading Public High School in the municipality. It is the Venue of SSDC meet in the cluster of Aurora, Labangan and Tukuran for the preparation for  yearly provincial meet.

Campuses

Former names
Tukuran Comprehensive National High School - 2004-2010
San Carlos National High School - ?
San Carlos Barangay High School - ?

Principals
Luther Castillo, Ed.D. - present
Visminda E. Serrato, Ed.D. 
Mrs. Clara D. Hamoy
Danilo P. Ungang, Ed.D.
Exaltacion G. Jabone, Ed.D.

See also

Tukuran, Zamboanga del Sur

Notes

External links
mypagadian.com
pagadian.org

High schools in the Philippines
Schools in Zamboanga del Sur